The following is a list of characters from the wuxia novel Qijian Xia Tianshan by Liang Yusheng. Some of these characters also appear in the novels Baifa Monü Zhuan and Saiwai Qixia Zhuan.

Mount Heaven School 

 Ling Weifeng, nicknamed "Holy Light of Mount Heaven" after his famous anqi (projectile weapon), was previously known as Liang Mulang. 18 years ago, he was tricked into revealing the identities of the anti-Qing rebels, and had attempted suicide in guilt after being slapped and accused by Liu Yufang, whom he had a crush on. However, he encountered a dying Yang Yuncong, who entrusted his infant daughter to his care, so he brought the girl to Reverend Huiming, Yang Yuncong's master. Ling Weifeng then became Huiming's third apprentice and a formidable swordsman after training for 18 years under Huiming's tutelage. However, he has a strong tendency to suffer from seizures when exposed to cold weather. This becomes his fatal weakness when he experiences a sudden fit during a duel with Chu Zhaonan when he is just about to slay his opponent. Chu Zhaonan turns the tables on him, cuts off his right thumb, captures him, and imprisons him in an underground labyrinth in Tibet. Ling Weifeng survives the ordeal and continues his heroic quest as a swordsman dedicated to upholding justice and helping the poor and oppressed.
 Yilan Zhu is Yang Yuncong and Nalan Minghui's daughter. She was brought to Mount Heaven by Ling Weifeng, and raised and trained in martial arts by him and Reverend Huiming. Although she manages to assassinate Prince Dodo and avenge her father, she is captured and imprisoned before being rescued later. She becomes Zhang Huazhao's love interest and marries him eventually.
 Chu Zhaonan is Reverend Huiming's second apprentice who inherited the Soaring Dragon Sword from his master. Tempted by fame and glory, he initially served under Wu Sangui but later betrayed his master and became a servant of the Kangxi Emperor, who appoints him as an imperial guard commander. He is defeated by Yilan Zhu in the final battle in the Tibetan labyrinth and sustains serious injuries, including the loss of his left arm. He chooses to commit suicide to avoid humiliation.
 Yang Yuncong was Reverend Huiming's first apprentice and he inherited the Jade Breaking Sword from his master. He had a secret affair with Nalan Minghui, who bore him a daughter. However, he could not be together with Nalan Minghui as she had been forced to marry Prince Dodo. He was severely injured by Niuhuru, and died from his wounds after killing his foe. Before dying, he entrusted his infant daughter to Ling Weifeng's care.
 Reverend Huiming is a reclusive Buddhist monk residing on Mount Heaven. Previously known as Yue Mingke in Baifa Monü Zhuan, he is considered one of the most powerful swordsmen and martial artists of his time. He dies in peace at the age of 112.
 Wuxing is a monk who serves as Huiming's personal assistant.

Gui Zhongming and associates 
 Gui Zhongming is Shi Tiancheng's son who was adopted by Gui Tianlan. He is drawn into the conflict between his father and stepfather, and goes berserk after thinking that he had killed his father in rage. He loses memory of his past and starts hallucinating and sleepwalking, during which he attacks people unknowingly. He meets Mao Wanlian and Fu Qingzhu, who help him recover from the trauma and reunites him with his family. He falls in love with Mao Wanlian and becomes extremely protective of her. Despite his formidable prowess in swordplay and anqi, he is reckless, nonchalant, easily agitated, and bereft of social etiquette. He becomes the founder of the northern branch of the Wudang School.
 Gui Tianlan is Ye Yunsun's eldest apprentice. He brings Shi Tiancheng's family with him to join Zhang Xianzhong's forces, and settles at Jiange after Sichuan falls to Qing forces. Believing that Shi Tiancheng had died, he marries Shi's wife and adopts Shi's children. He is killed in a fight against Shi Tiancheng and four imperial guards.
 Shi Daniang is Ye Yunsun's daughter. She marries Shi Tiancheng and bears him Zhongming and Zhujun. After her husband's apparent death, she marries Gui Tianlan, who helps to take care of her and her children. She and Gui Tianlan maintain a sibling-like relationship even though they are a married couple in name. She is well-versed in the "Five Birds Swordplay" and she imparts this skill to her son.
 Shi Zhujun is Gui Zhongming's younger sister.
 Ye Yunsun was Gui Zhongming's maternal grandfather. He treated Gui Tianlan and Shi Tiancheng like his sons and trained them in martial arts.
 Yu Zhong is Shi Tiancheng's apprentice. He saved his master when the latter attempted suicide by jumping off a cliff.

Zhongnan School and associates 
 Fu Qingzhu is an eccentric swordsman and physician from the Zhongnan School. He is renowned for his mastery of the "Infinite Swordplay".
 Mao Wanlian is Mao Pijiang and Dong Xiaowan's daughter who was raised and trained in martial arts by Fu Qingzhu. She meets Gui Zhongming, who was suffering from hallucinations then, and helps him recover from his trauma and reunites him with his family. Gui Zhongming falls in love with her and becomes extremely protective of her. Just like her parents, she is talented in poetry and literary arts. She develops a close relationship with Nalan Rongruo because of their common interest, but marries Gui Zhongming eventually.
 Shan Sinan is Fu Qingzhu's senior and Liu Jingyi's close friend. He becomes Liu Yufang's godfather and trains her in swordplay.

Wu family 
 Wu Yuanying is the master of the Wu Family Manor and a close friend of Fu Qingzhu. He offers shelter to the rebels in his residence.
 Wu Chenghua is Wu Yuanying's son.

Lian Nichang and associates 
 Lian Nichang / Lian Nishang, nicknamed "White Haired Demoness", is the protagonist of Baifa Monü Zhuan and Zhuo Yihang's lover. She was heartbroken after she wrongly believed that Zhuo Yihang had betrayed her love, and her hair turned white overnight. She died at the age of 100, and her corpse is last seen lying beside Zhuo Yihang's shrunken remains.
 Hamaya, nicknamed "Flying Red Sash", is Lian Nichang's apprentice and the love rival of Nalan Minghui in Saiwai Qixia Zhuan. Her hair turned white overnight after Yang Yuncong rejected her. She resolves her rivalry with Nalan and saves Yilan Zhu from death. She transfers her love for Yang Yuncong to Yilan Zhu and treats her like a daughter. At the end of the novel, she returns to her former position as the chief of her tribe.
 Wu Qiongyao is Wu Yuanying's daughter. By chance, she encounters Lian Nichang, who accepts her as an apprentice. Despite learning martial arts for only three years under Lian Nichang's tutelage, she emerges as a powerful swordswoman. She marries Li Siyong eventually and bears him a son and a daughter. She settles on Mount Heaven with her children after her husband's death.

Wudang School 

 Xin Longzi is Zhuo Yihang's first apprentice. While he was in Tibet, he once saw Han Zhibang practising martial arts from the Yijin Jing and immediately realised that the manual contains the missing moves to his master's "Bodhidharma Swordplay". He seizes the manual from Han Zhibang through trickery and masters the skills in it, becoming even more powerful than before. He desires to have a precious sword of his own and is tricked by Chu Zhaonan into helping the villains. Chu Zhaonan attempts to kill him to seize the Yijin Jing but he is saved by Ling Weifeng and survives. Ling Weifeng turns him back to the path of goodness, and he decides to follow his benefactor. He engages Qi Zhenjun in a prolonged duel and inflicts a killing blow on him after the latter is severely injured by Shi Tiancheng. Shortly after the fight, he dies of exhaustion.
 Shi Tiancheng is Gui Tianlan's junior. He left to fetch his relatives during the Qing invasion of Sichuan and entrusted his family to Gui Tianlan's care. He was thought to be dead, so Gui Tianlan married his wife and adopted his children. When he returns later, he feels that Gui Tianlan had betrayed him by taking away his family from him. He is accepted by Zhuo Yihang as an apprentice, despite already having a background in other forms of martial arts. Later, he confronts Gui Tianlan and causes him to die, but soon regrets upon learning the truth from his wife. He promises that the firstborn child of his son will bear Gui's family name to help him manage his guilt. He helps Xin Longzi in the fight against Qi Zhenjun and manages to inflict severe wounds on Qi Zhenjun. However, he is also mortally wounded and dies from his injuries later.
 Zhuo Yihang was Lian Nichang's lover and the Wudang School's leader at the end of Baifa Monü Zhuan. Already dead when the events in Qijian Xia Tianshan take place, he had finally obtained the flowers that can turn his lover's white hair black again, but did not live to pass them to her personally. Before his death, he told Xin Longzi to use chemical means to reduce the size of his body in order to prevent his enemies from identifying and destroying his remains. His shrunken skeleton is last seen lying beside Lian Nichang's dead body.
 Xuanzhen is Taoist Huangye's apprentice and the current leader of Wudang. He encounters Wu Qiongyao and duels with her when she teases him about his skills. He is unable to defeat her and feels angry and ashamed. At the end of the novel, he gives up his position as leader of Wudang to Gui Zhongming after seeing that he has mastered their school's long-lost "Bodhidharma Swordplay".
 He Lühua is a character from Baifa Monü Zhuan. Although she is approaching the age of 50, she is described as youthful-looking. She accompanies Xuanzhen on the journey to Xinjiang.
 He Lühua's husband, whose name is not mentioned in the novel, accompanies his wife and Xuanzhen to Xinjiang.
 Xuantong and Xuanjue are Xuanzhen's juniors who accompany him to Xinjiang.

Tiandihui and other rebel forces 

 Han Zhibang, initially a stable keeper, is the chief of the Tiandihui, an anti-Qing secret society. Later, he passes his position as chief to Liu Yufang, whom he has a crush on. He lacks the courage to confess his feelings to her and leaves after seeing that she has feelings for Ling Weifeng. He finds the Yijin Jing and masters an incomplete set of the skills, which temporarily boosts his prowess in martial arts, and helps the Tibetan lamas retrieve the stolen śarīras, earning their respect in return. He uses his close relations with the Tibetans to help the rebels on a few occasions. Later, he encounters a dying Xin Longzi and fulfils his final request to join the Wudang School. He takes back the Yijin Jing and passes his knowledge of the "Bodhidharma Swordplay" to Gui Zhongming. Eventually, he willingly sacrifices himself to save Ling Weifeng by secretly switching places with him when Ling Weifeng is imprisoned in the labyrinth. Then, he attempts to ambush Chu Zhaonan when he comes to check on Ling Weifeng, but ends up being killed by Chu Zhaonan.
 Yang Yiwei
 Hua Zishan

Southern Ming rebels 
 Liu Yufang, nicknamed "Brocade Cloud Sword", is Liu Jingyi's daughter. She leads the rebels to resist Prince Dodo's forces in Hangzhou and succeeds Han Zhibang as chief of the Tiandihui later. She becomes an ally of the Seven Swords at the end of the novel.
 Zhang Huazhao is Zhang Huangyan's son. He attempts to assassinate Prince Dodo on Mount Wutai but fails due to Yilan Zhu's untimely interruption. He falls in love with Yilan Zhu and goes through troubles to save her from death. In addition to his reunion with Yilan Zhu after she is rescued by Hamaya, he also learns a set of qinggong techniques from Lian Nichang. He marries Yilan Zhu at the end of the novel, and also joins the Wudang School as Gui Zhongming's junior, becoming a master of the "Bodhidharma Swordplay".
 Tongming is nicknamed "Strange Monk".
 Chang Ying is nicknamed "God of Death".
 Cheng Tong is nicknamed "Iron Tower".
 The Prince of Lu is the self-appointed regent of the Southern Ming.
 Prince of Lu's followers:
 Zhang Huangyan
 Zhang Mingzhen
 Liu Jingyi

Mount Changbai School 
 Qi Zhenjun is the founder of the Mount Changbai School. In his younger days, he challenged Reverend Huiming to a duel but was refused, causing him to have a false impression that he was better than Huiming. He encountered Lian Nichang later and was defeated by her and driven away. After spending five decades honing his skills in the Changbai Mountains, he returns to assist the Qing government in dealing with the rebels. He is severely injured by Shi Tiancheng in a fight and is eventually slain by Xin Longzi.
 Qiu Dongluo is Niuhuru's junior who wields a pair of blades in combat and uses a variety of combination attacks to confuse his opponents. Taking on a fake Han Chinese identity to gather news in the jianghu, he is responsible for disfiguring Ling Weifeng when the latter was bringing the baby Yilan Zhu to Mount Heaven. When he encounters Ling Weifeng again several years later, Ling Weifeng slices off his ears in revenge. He is killed by Yilan Zhu in a fight later.
 Niuhuru was a Manchu martial artist and an apprentice of Qi Zhenjun. He was slain by Yang Yuncong in a fight but managed to mortally wound Yang Yuncong before dying.
 Liu Xiyan is one of Qi Zhenjun's apprentices. He follows his master and Qiu Dongluo to help the Qing government fight the rebels.

Qing Empire

Imperial family 
 The Shunzhi Emperor was the former ruler of the Qing Empire. He disappeared mysteriously after Dong Xiaowan's death and became a monk in Qingliang Monastery on Mount Wutai to seek peace and redemption. He is murdered by Yan Zhongtian on his son's orders.
 The Kangxi Emperor is the Shunzhi Emperor's son and the current ruler of the Qing Empire.
 The Third Princess, whose name is not mentioned, is the Shunzhi Emperor's third daughter and a sister of the Kangxi Emperor. She often sneaks out to find Nalan Rongruo to escape the boredom of life in the palace. Once, Nalan Rongruo requested a special medicine from her to heal an injured Zhang Huazhao, and she insisted on meeting his new guest. She develops a crush on Zhang Huazhao and decides to sacrifice herself to help him rescue Yilan Zhu because she knows he truly loves Yilan Zhu. Eventually, she commits suicide after stealing a special seal from the Kangxi Emperor that can authorise Yilan Zhu's release from prison.

Nobles 
 Dodo is a Manchu prince who is also the governor of Jiangnan and Jiangxi. He is well-versed in military strategy and martial arts. Although he is aware that Nalan Minghui is unhappy about being forced to marry him, he still loves her genuinely and dies in his wife's arms after being assassinated by Yilan Zhu.
 Nalan Minghui is Nalan Xiuji's daughter who is talented in literary and martial arts. She had a secret affair with Yang Yuncong and bore him a daughter, but was forced to marry Prince Dodo. She treated Dodo indifferently after their marriage but still respected him as her husband. When Yilan Zhu returns to take revenge on Dodo, she tries to stop both sides from harming each other but fails. When Yilan Zhu is imprisoned for murdering Prince Dodo, she tries to save her daughter but is unable to do so and commits suicide.
 Nalan Rongruo is Yilan Zhu's cousin and a talented scholar and poet highly favoured by the Kangxi Emperor. Having a strong disdain for bloodshed and conflict, he constantly hopes that everyone in the Qing Empire can live in harmony so he secretly helps the rebels on numerous occasions.
 Nalan Mingzhu is Nalan Rongruo's father. He pretends to be a patron of literary arts by hiring people to help him write poems and pieces of literature, so that he can win the favour of the Kangxi Emperor, who likes intellectuals and literati.
 Nalan Xiuji is a Manchu general who contributed to the founding of the Qing Empire. He is appointed chief of Hangzhou's armed forces.
 Yunti is the Kangxi Emperor's 14th son who leads the Qing army to conquer Tibet and capture the Dalai Lama.
 Geji, Prince Cheng is a Manchu noble in command of the Qing army attacking Xinjiang. He is versed in military strategy but not good in martial arts.

Government officials 
 Chen Jin is a general who conquered the Southern Ming regime.
 Hutunuke is a general involved in the campaign in Xinjiang.
 Zhao Liangdong is the governor-general of Sichuan and Shaanxi.
 Li Benshen is a general stationed in Kunming.
 Zhu Guozhi is the governor of Yunnan.
 Hong Chengchou

Imperial guards 
 Zhang Chengbin is the second-in-command of the imperial guards. Prince Dodo orders him to lead 3,000 men on a manhunt for the rebels, and he arrives at the Wu Family Manor. He is ordered to retreat by Yan Zhongtian, who is superior in rank to him.
 Hu Tianzhu is an imperial guard commander ranking below Chu Zhaonan and Zhang Chengbin. He follows Chu Zhaonan to capture Gui Zhongming and the rebels hiding in Nalan Rongruo's house. Later, he is defeated by Meng Wuwei and knocked into a ditch.
 Gu Yuanliang is an imperial guard from Henan who specialises in dianxue techniques. He follows Chu Zhaonan to seize the śarīras.
 Hao Dashou is an imperial guard who follows Chu Zhaonan to seize the śarīras. He is killed by the Tibetan lamas protecting the relics.
 Zhang Kui, who uses a copper red sword, follows Qiu Dongluo to hunt down and kill Ling Weifeng. He has his arm sliced off by Liu Yufang in a fight.
 Peng Kunlin is Zhang Kui's companion who uses a white wax pole in combat.
 Hao Jiming is Zhang Kui's companion who uses a pair of grappling hooks.
 Jiao Ba is a former bandit nicknamed "Eight Armed Nezha" sent along with three other imperial guards to hunt down and kill Gui Tianlan. He is killed by Shi Tiancheng, who grabs him and they fall off a cliff together.
 Wang Gang specialises in "Vajra Sanshou". He wants to become chief of the imperial guards but is disappointed when Chu Zhaonan takes the position. He intends to defeat and capture Ling Weifeng to prove his ability but fails. After his defeat, he grabs Mao Wanlian and holds her hostage, but Ling Weifeng saves Mao Wanlian and kills him with his anqi.
 Shen Tianbao and his brother Shen Tianhu are the apprentices of Hong Sibazi, a martial arts master from Cangzhou. They are skilled in the "Wugou Sword Movement" and are eventually slain by Ling Weifeng in a duel.
 Diao Sifu is an imperial guard serving under Chu Zhaonan. He is good in qinggong and slightly better than Han Zhibang in martial arts.

Palace guards 
 Cheng Tianting is a palace guard commander nicknamed "Iron Brush Judge" because he specialises in dianxue techniques and uses a pair of ink brushes in combat. He is almost on par with Chu Zhaonan in martial arts prowess. At the end of the novel, he is caught off guard and immobilised by Han Zhibang while watching over the captured Ling Weifeng, and ultimately defeated and slain by Yilan Zhu and Liu Yufang.
 Yan Zhongtian is a trusted bodyguard of the Kangxi Emperor. After he discovers that the Shunzhi Emperor is still alive and has become a monk, the Kangxi Emperor forces him to murder the Shunzhi Emperor and attempts to poison him to death later to silence him. He is saved by Ling Weifeng and given medical treatment by Fu Qingzhu. He sacrifices himself to help the rebels by ordering Zhang Chengbin and his men to retreat, but dies from poisoning as his healing process was interrupted.
 Zheng Tiepai is a palace guard who uses a pair of iron shields in combat. He is slain by Ling Weifeng.
 Cheng Tianting's deputies:
 Zheng Dakun
 Lian Sanhu is blinded by Wu Qiongyao in a fight.

Others 
 Hong Tao and Jiao Zhi are guards from the residence of the governor-general of Sichuan and Shaanxi. They lead Wang Gang and the Shen brothers to Gui Tianlan's house. They are slain by Gui Zhongming in a duel.
 Lu Ming and Lu Liang are two brothers who serve as martial arts instructors in Nalan Mingzhu's residence.
 Zhou Qing is one of the guards watching over Ling Weifeng when he is imprisoned in a labyrinth in Tibet. His grandfather served Dorgon during the Shunzhi Emperor's reign and was killed after helping his master complete a secret mission. Ling Weifeng's kindness leads him to understand true friendship and loyalty. He is impressed with Ling Weifeng and befriends him, secretly agreeing to help him escape.
 Ma Fang is Zhou Qing's colleague. Of Uyghur descent and originally from Xinjiang, he was recommended by Shang Yunting to serve the Qing government. He is ashamed of himself when Ling Weifeng tells him about how Qing forces invaded his homeland and mistreated his people. Like many others, he becomes impressed with Ling Weifeng and decides to help him escape.

Li Laiheng forces 
 Li Siyong is Li Laiheng's younger brother who is versed in military strategy and literary arts, and specialises in using anqi. He is sent as an envoy to discuss a truce and temporary alliance with Wu Sangui. Later, he marries Wu Qiongyao, whom he met and fell in love with. At the end of the novel, he is killed in battle in western Sichuan.
 Li Laiheng is Li Jin's foster son who escapes to Yunnan with Li Zicheng's remnant forces and forms an insurgent army to resist the Qing Empire. He commits suicide after his army is defeated and besieged by Qing forces.
 Li Jin is Li Zicheng's nephew who is killed in action in Henan against Qing forces.
 Zhang Qingyuan is sent by Li Laiheng to lead a group of men to eliminate the Five Dragons Gang.
 Jiang Zhuang is Zhang Qingyuan's deputy. He is injured by Zhang Yihu and healed by Fu Qingzhu later.

Bandits 
These bandits initially plotted with Han Jing to rob Li Dingguo's treasure. They are impressed with Ling Weifeng's heroism and skills after losing to him in a contest, and agree to submit to him. Ling Weifeng recommends them to join Li Laiheng's rebel army later.

 Zhang Yuanzhen is nicknamed "Eight Directions Saber".
 Tao Hong, nicknamed "Dark Fearsome Deity", specialises in wrestling.
 Luo Da is a bandit chief from Mount Mei in northern Sichuan. He is the most greedy of the group, and was the first to charge into the treasure cave and injured by the traps.
 Da Sangong is the headman of a tribe who is referred to as "Headman Da". He specialises in the Iron Vest, which allows him to concentrate inner energy on parts of his body and make them extremely tough and impenetrable by sharp weapons.
 Lu Dalengzi is the chief of the Qingyang Gang and the most honest and lawful of the group. He loses to Ling Weifeng in a qinggong competition.

Li Dingguo forces 
 Li Dingguo was a former deputy of Zhang Xianzhong who took control of Sichuan after Zhang Xianzhong's death and resisted the Qing invaders until his death. He left behind a treasure hoard for future generations to continue his legacy. The treasure comprises 18 giant statues of himself, all made of gold. He also left behind a precious Soaring Dragon Sword, which once belonged to Xiong Tingbi. The sword becomes Gui Zhongming's weapon.
 Han Jing is a former subordinate of Li Dingguo. A hunchback, he specialises in the staff. After losing to Ling Weifeng in a contest of inner energy, he pledges allegiance to the latter. Ling Weifeng suggests to him to bring his fellows to join Li Laiheng's rebel army.
 He Wanfang is a craftsman who worked with Gui Tianlan on constructing the traps in the treasure cave. He leads Han Jing and company into the cave to rob the treasure and follows the others to join Li Laiheng later.
 Zhu Tianmu and Yang Qingbo are two former subordinates of Li Dingguo. They are killed in battle against Qing forces.

Wuwei Security Service 
 Meng Wuwei is the master of the Wuwei Security Service who has a strong reputation in the jianghu; most bandits usually avoid robbing his convoys. He uses a tobacco pipe to execute dianxue techniques and blow smoke patterns whenever his men are escorting a convoy, so as to alert potential robbers to his presence. He and his son appear to help the protagonists fight Chu Zhaonan and some imperial guards at one point.
 Meng Jian is Meng Wuwei's son. He is tasked with escorting a group of maidens to Nalan Mingzhu's residence, with the Lu brothers assisting him. He runs into the Three Devils, who attempt to seize the maidens from him, and manages to survive until Gui Zhongming and Mao Wanlian appear to help him.

Tibet 
 The Dalai Lama is the spiritual leader of Tibet.
 The Red Robed Lama, whose name is not mentioned, is sent by the Dalai Lama to follow Chu Zhaonan to meet Wu Sangui and affirm their alliance. When he discovers that Chu Zhaonan is planning to betray Wu Sangui, Chu Zhaonan attempts to kill him to silence him. He is saved by Ling Weifeng and brings news of Wu Sangui's rebellion to the Southern Ming rebels. He is killed by Chu Zhaonan during the battle in the Tibetan labyrinth.
 Zongda Wanzhen is one of the lamas escorting the śarīras. He is installed as the Dalai Lama by Yunti when Qing forces occupied Tibet. He agrees to help Han Zhibang save Ling Weifeng from prison and is so impressed with Han's sacrifice that he called Han a tulku.

Heaven Dragon School 
 Tianlong Shangren is the leader and founder of the Heaven Dragon School.
 Tianmeng Shangren is Tianlong Shangren's junior.
 Tianxiong Shangren is another of Tianlong Shangren's juniors. He and Qi Zhenjun appear at the tribal chiefs' meeting to help Menglu intimidate the chiefs into submitting to the Qing government. He is defeated by Xin Longzi in a fight.

Tribes of Xinjiang 
 Maigaiti is a close friend of Yang Yuncong in Saiwai Qixia Zhuan.
 Manlingna is Maigaiti's wife.
 Yishida is a close friend of Yang Yuncong in Saiwai Qixia Zhuan. He attempts to stop Menglu from persuading the Uyghur tribes to surrender to the Qing government. Menglu attacks him and he dies from his injuries later. He passes the guardian sword of the Heaven Dragon School (previously obtained by Yang Yuncong) to Ling Weifeng, who passes it to Xin Longzi later.
 Menglu is the chief of the Kadaer tribe. In Saiwai Qixia Zhuan, he once accused Yang Yuncong of being a spy when Yang started a romance with Nalan Minghui. He allies with the Qing government and attempts to persuade the tribes to submit to the Qing government. His plan is disrupted by his daughter and Hukeji.
 Mengmanlisi is Menglu's daughter. She is aware that her father is betraying their people's trust by helping the Qing government. She disrupts his plan with the help of Hukeji, who is in love with her.
 Hukeji is the young chief of the Kazakh tribe. With help from Ling Weifeng and Xin Longzi, he succeeds in stopping Menglu from persuading the people to submit to the Qing government.
 Mengshan is Menglu's son.

Five Dragons Gang 
 Ge Zhonglong was a deceased martial artist from Yunnan who taught each of his five apprentices one of his five martial arts specialties. The five apprentices later founded the Five Dragons Gang.
 Zhang Yihu specialises in the "Iron Gravel Palm". He is captured by Fu Qingzhu and commits suicide.
 Li Erbao specialises in using the three-section staff. He is killed by Gui Zhongming.
 Zhao Sanqi specialises in the "Earth Kick". He is killed by Fu Qingzhu.
 Qian Silin specialises in the "Five Elements Fist". He is killed by Gui Zhongming.
 Tang Wuxiong specialises in using anqi. He is killed by Fu Qingzhu.

Three Feudatories

Wu Sangui forces 
 Wu Sangui is a general in charge of Yunnan and Sichuan. Initially granted the title of "Prince Who Pacifies the West" by the Qing Empire, he plots a rebellion against the Qing Empire later.
 Zhang Tianmeng is Wu Sangui's subordinate. He steals the śarīras when Chu Zhaonan attempts to rob them from him. He is injured by Ling Weifeng and recuperates in a cave after escaping. He encounters Han Zhibang and is killed by him in the ensuing fight.
 Fan Zheng is one of the three best warriors serving under Wu Sangui (the other two are Chu Zhaonan and Zhang Tianmeng). He is skilled in using the "Sky Touching Swordplay". He is defeated by a bare-handed Ling Weifeng in a duel.
 Bao Zhu is a general serving under Wu Sangui.
 Wu Shifan is Wu Sangui's grandson and successor.

Shang Kexi forces 
 Shang Kexi is a general in charge of Guangdong who was granted the title of "Prince Who Pacifies the South" by the Qing Empire.
 Shang Zhixin is Shang Kexi's son.
 Jin Ya is Shang Kexi's emissary to Wu Sangui.

Geng Zhongming forces 
 Geng Zhongming is a general in charge of Fujian who was granted the title of "Prince Who Guards the South" by the Qing Empire.
 Geng Jingzhong is Geng Zhongming's grandson.

Others 
 Shi Zhenfei is the elderly master of a security service and a close ally of the Tiandihui. Despite his age, he has a strong inner energy foundation, and is still capable of performing swordplay swiftly and accurately.
 Shang Yunting is the leader of the Iron Fan Gang. Initially reluctant to accept Hao Feifeng as his apprentice, he fell for Han Feifeng's feminine charms and eventually agreed. He is defeated by Meng Wuwei and Shi Zhenfei, and driven away from Jiangnan. Later, he arrives in Xinjiang and allies with Chu Zhaonan to counter the rebels, injuring Wu Yuanying in an unprovoked attack. He is defeated and captured by Fu Qingzhu and commits suicide in humiliation.
 The "Three Devils":
 Hao Feifeng is a jianghu lowlife and bandit who uses an iron fan in combat. He behaves in a feminine manner and is seen as a transsexual by his contemporaries. He and his companions attempt to seize the women escorted by Meng Jian. Later, he follows his master to Xinjiang after their defeat by Meng Wuwei and Shi Zhenfei. He is captured after attempting to attack the Wu family, and is slain by Wu Qiongyao.
 Sha Wuding is killed by Gui Zhongming.
 Liu Daxiong
 The "Three Sang Devils" are three villains who used to terrorise the Mount Heaven region, but were defeated and driven away by Lian Nichang. They return to Mount Heaven to seek vengeance several years later. They are defeated and slain by Ling Weifeng eventually.
 Sangqian
 Sanghu
 Sangren
 Mao Xiang is referred to as "Mao Pijiang" in the novel. He was a famous scholar and patron of the arts, and a close friend of Fu Qingzhu. He died from anguish and frustration after losing his wife.
 Dong Xiaowan was a courtesan who married Mao Xiang because of their common interest in the arts. She was forcefully separated from her husband and brought to the palace to be the Shunzhi Emperor's concubine. The Shunzhi Emperor treated her well but the nobles despised her because she was a Han Chinese. She was killed on the empress dowager's orders.
 Wu Meicun was a poet and scholar favoured by the Shunzhi Emperor. He was secretly murdered on the Kangxi Emperor's orders after writing a poem hinting that the Shunzhi Emperor is still alive on Mount Wutai.
 Gu Liangfen was a close friend of Nalan Rongruo. When Wu Hancha was sent into exile, he wrote the Jinlüqu to Nalan Rongruo, hinting that he needed Nalan Rongruo's help to save Wu Hancha. Mao Wanlian sang the song to Nalan Rongruo when she needed his help in saving Ling Weifeng from Chu Zhaonan's clutches.
 Wu Hancha was a close friend of Nalan Rongruo. He was sent into exile but was saved from his fate by Nalan Rongruo.

See also 
 List of organisations in wuxia fiction

References 

 

Lists of Liang Yusheng characters
Fictional Qing dynasty people